A  is a kind of white cloth, usually cotton, or less commonly linen, used to make various garments in Japan, such as juban (a kind of under-kimono), fundoshi, or tenugui. A length of  may be wrapped around the body under a kimono as a haramaki, or around the chest to bind the breasts.

See also
 Bandeau
 Breast binding

References

Dresses
Japanese sashes
Folk costumes
Undergarments
History of Asian clothing
Japanese words and phrases